Metsküla may refer to several places in Estonia:

Metsküla, Ida-Viru County, village in Mäetaguse Parish, Ida-Viru County
Metsküla, Lääne County, village in Lihula Parish, Lääne County
Metsküla, Märjamaa Parish, village in Märjamaa Parish, Rapla County
Metsküla, Raikküla Parish, village in Raikküla Parish, Rapla County
Metsküla, Saare County, village in Leisi Parish, Saare County
Metsküla, Viljandi County, village in Põhja-Sakala Parish, Viljandi County

See also
Metsaküla (disambiguation)